During World War II, the United States Army Air Forces (USAAF) established numerous airfields in Georgia for antisubmarine defense in the Gulf of Mexico and for training pilots and aircrews of USAAF fighters and bombers.

Most of these airfields were under the command of Third Air Force or the Army Air Forces Training Command (AAFTC)  However the other USAAF support commands (Air Technical Service Command (ATSC); Air Transport Command (ATC) or Troop Carrier Command) commanded a significant number of airfields in a support roles.

It is still possible to find remnants of these wartime airfields. Many were converted into municipal airports, some were returned to agriculture and several were retained as United States Air Force installations and were front-line bases during the Cold War. Hundreds of the temporary buildings that were used survive today, and are being used for other purposes.

Major airfields

First Air Force, later Third Air Force
 425th Base Headquarters & Air Base Squadron:  22 January 194310 April 1944
 114th Army Air Force Base Unit (First AF):  10 April 194428 March 1945
 323rd Army Air Force Base Unit (Third AF):  1 May 19458 Jun 1947
 Also used by:  Army Air Forces Antisubmarine Command (1942–1943)
 Transferred to:  Third Air Force (1945)
 Was: Chatham Air Force Base (1947–1950)
 Now: Savannah/Hilton Head International Airport 
 And  Savannah Air National Guard Base
 And  Georgia ANG Combat Readiness Training Center
 Sub-base of: Dale Mabry Field, Florida
 346th Army Air Force Base Unit (Third AF):  1 May 19441945
 Transferred to: United States Navy (1945)
 Now: Harris Neck National Wildlife Refuge

Third Air Force

 Sub-base of: Morris Field. North Carolina, later William Northern Field, Tennessee
 4157 Army Air Force Base Unit: 1 May 194526 January 1946
 Now: Statesboro-Bulloch County Airport 
 339th Army Air Force Base Unit:  1 May 19446 February 1946
 Now: Thomasville Regional Airport 

 Air Base Squadron, 35th Air Base Group/36th Air Base Squadron/36th Base Headquarters & Air Base Squadron:  5 October 19401 May 1944
 302nd Army Air Force Base Unit:  1 May 194415 December 1946
 Also used by:  Army Air Forces Antisubmarine Command (1942–1943)
 Was: Hunter Air Force Base (1950–1967)
 Now:  Hunter Army Airfield (United States Army) 
 And:  Coast Guard Air Station Savannah
 531st Base Headquarters & Air Base Squadron:  10 May 19431 May 1944
 345th Army Air Force Base Unit:  1 May 194410 October 1945
 Sub-base of: Hunter Field, later Drew Field, Florida
 Now: Waycross-Ware County Airport

AAF Training Command
Eastern Flying Training Command

 AAF Basic Flying Training School/AAF Pilot School (Basic):  15 Jun 19421 May 1945
 322nd Base Headquarters & Air Base Squadron:  25 July 194230 April 1944
 2127th Army Air Force Base Unit (AAF Eastern Flying Training Command):  30 April 19441 May 1945
 4164th Army Air Force Base Unit:(Air Technical Service Command): 1 May 19459 March 1946
 Known sub-bases and auxiliaries
 Donalsonville Auxiliary Field
 Reynoldville Auxiliary Field
 Faceville Auxiliary Field
 Vada Auxiliary Field
 Babcock Auxiliary Field
 Commodore Decatur Auxiliary Field
 Later: Bainbridge Air Base (1951–1961)
 3306th Pilot Training Group (Contract Flying)
 Now: Decatur County Industrial Air Park 
 Air Corps Basic Flying School/AAF Basic Flying Sch/AAF Pilot School (Basic):  15 May 194115 April 1945
 Hq, 27th Flying Training Wing:  26 December 1942-1 May 1945
 61st Air Base Squadron/61st Base Headquarters & Air Base Squadron:  28 May 194130 April 1944
 2128th Army Air Force Base Unit:  1 May 194415 April 1945
 Known sub-bases and auxiliaries
 Gunn Auxiliary Field
 Perry Auxiliary Field
 Harris Auxiliary Field
 Byron Auxiliary Field
 Myrtle Auxiliary Field
 Now: Middle Georgia Regional Airport 
 Air Corps Advanced Flying School (Two Engine)/AAF Advanced Flying School (Two Engine)/AAF Pilot School (Advanced, Two Engine):  26 June 194130 April 1945
 Hq, 29th Flying Training Wing:  26 December 1942-1 April 1945
 78th Air Base Squadron/78th Base Headquarters & Air Base Squadron:  25 November 194130 April 1944
 2144th Army Air Force Base Unit:  1 May 194430 April 1945
 Known sub-bases and auxiliaries 
 Rock Ford Auxiliary Field
 Lake Park Auxiliary Field
 Bemiss Auxiliary Field
 New River Auxiliary Field
 Valdosta Auxiliary Field
 Now:  Moody Air Force Base 

 Air Corps Advanced Flying School (Single Engine)/AAF Advanced Flying School (Single Engine)/AAF Pilot School (Advanced, Single Engine):  12 July 19411 August 1945
 75th Air Base Squadron/75th Base Headquarters & Air Base Squadron:  26 December 194130 April 1944
 2133rd Army Air Force Base Unit:  1 May 194415 December 1945
 Known sub-bases and auxiliaries   
 Berlin Auxiliary Field
 Norman Park Auxiliary Field
 Moultrie Municipal Airport
 Tifton Municipal Airport
 Later: Spence Air Base (1951–1961)
 3302d Flying Training Squadron (Contract Flying)
 Now: Spence Airport 
 Air Corps Advanced Flying School (Two Engine)/AAF Advanced Flying School (Two Engine)/AAF Pilot School (Advanced, Two Engine):  1 August 1941-15 August 1946
 Hq, 74th Flying Training Wing:  25 Aug 43-Unknown
 68th Air Base Squadron/68th Base Headquarters & Air Base Squadron:  25 June 194130 April 1944
 2109th Army Air Force Base Unit:  1 May 194415 August 1946
 Known sub-bases and auxiliaries  
 Leesburg Auxiliary Field
 West Smithville Auxiliary Field
 West Leesburg Auxiliary Field
 North Smithville Auxiliary Field
 Cordele Municipal Airport
 Vidalia-Lyons Auxiliary Field
 Tifton Municipal Airport
 Albany Army Airfield
 Later: Turner Air Force Base (1947–1967)
 Later: Naval Air Station Albany (1967–1976)
 Now: Non-Aviation Use (Industrial Area); runway removed

AAF Contract Flying Schools

 Contract Flying School: Darr Aero Tech
 Also: Auxiliary to Turner Field
 52nd Army Air Force Flying Training Detachment (Primary)
 Known sub-bases and auxiliaries     
 Hayley Auxiliary Field
 Reynolds Auxiliary Field
 River Auxiliary Field
 Turner Auxiliary Field
 Now: Southwest Georgia Regional Airport 
 Contract Flying School: Georgia Aero Tech
 72nd Army Air Force Flight training Detachment (Basic) 
 Known sub-bases and auxiliaries 
 Dionne Auxiliary Field
 Yawn Auxiliary Field
 Now: Augusta Regional Airport 

 South Georgia College Civil Pilot Training School (Primary)
 63d Flight Training Detachment
 Known sub-bases and auxiliaries 
 Tanner-Ewing Auxiliary Field
 Knight Auxiliary Field
 Dorminey Auxiliary Field
 Paulk Auxiliary Field
 Now: Douglas Municipal Airport 
 Souther Civil Pilot Training School (Primary)
 56th AAF Flying Training Detachment (Primary)
 Now: Jimmy Carter Regional Airport

Air Technical Service Command

 Base Detachment/303rd Air Base Squadron/303rd Base Headquarters & Air Base Squadron:  15 January 19411 April 1944
 4204th Army Air Force Base Unit: 1 April 1944-26 May 1946
 Warner Robins Air Service Command (WRASC)
 USAAF/Civil Airfield Joint Use
 Also used by: United States Navy
 Now: Hartsfield-Jackson Atlanta International Airport 
 21st Air Base Squadron/21st Base Headquarters & Air Base Squadron:  8 August 19411 April 1944
 4050th Army Air Force Base Unit:  1 April 19444 March 1946
 Warner Robins Air Service Command (WRASC)
 Also used by Third Air Force (1941-1942)
 Joint use USAAF/Civil Airfield
 Also used by: Army Air Forces Antisubmarine Command (1942–1943) 
 Now: Daniel Field 
 37th Air Depot Group
 469th Army Air Force Base Unit
 Warner Robins Air Service Command (WRASC)
 USAAF/Civil Airfield Joint Use
 Now: Macon Downtown Airport 

 292d Army Air Force Base Unit:  25 March 19413 April 1944
 Bell Aircraft B-29 Superfortress Manufacturing/Delivery
 Also used by: Second Air Force 
 Now:  Dobbins Joint Air Reserve Base   
 4117th Army Air Force Base Unit
 Warner Robins Air Service Command (WRASC)
 Warner Robins Air Depot  
 Now:  Robins Air Force Base 
 And:  Warner Robins Air Logistics Center (WRALC)

Minor airfields

 Camp Benning Army Support
 54th Army Air Force Base Unit (I Troop Carrier Command)
 Was: Lawson Air Force Base (1947–1954)
 Now:  Lawson Army Airfield 

 Camp Stewart Army Support
 WASP/Antiaircraft Training
 Now:  MidCoast Regional Airport at Wright Army Airfield

References

 Manning, Thomas A. (2005), History of Air Education and Training Command, 1942–2002.  Office of History and Research, Headquarters, AETC, Randolph AFB, Texas 
 Maurer, Maurer (1983). Air Force Combat Units Of World War II. Maxwell AFB, Alabama: Office of Air Force History. .
 Ravenstein, Charles A. (1984). Air Force Combat Wings Lineage and Honors Histories 1947–1977. Maxwell AFB, Alabama: Office of Air Force History. .
 Thole, Lou (1999), Forgotten Fields of America : World War II Bases and Training, Then and Now – Vol. 2.  Pictorial Histories Pub . 
 Military Airfields in World War II – Georgia

01
World War II
World War II
World War II
Airfields of the United States Army Air Forces in the United States by state
United States World War II army airfields
Military history of Georgia (U.S. state)